The 1957 Ottawa Rough Riders finished in 2nd place in the IRFU with an 8–6 record but lost to the Montreal Alouettes in the East Semi-Final.

Preseason

Regular season

Standings

Schedule

Postseason

Playoffs

References

Ottawa Rough Riders seasons
1957 Canadian football season by team